Cornellana is one of 28 parishes (administrative divisions) in Salas, a municipality within the province and autonomous community of Asturias, in northern Spain.

It is located on the Camino Primitivo path of the Camino de Santiago.

Villages
Candanonegro (Candanunegro)
Cornellana (Curniana) 
Fajas (Faxas) 
Folguerinas (Folgueirinas) 
Fresnedo (Fresneo) 
La Pesquera 
La Reguera 
La Vega (La Veiga) 
La Vega de los Paredos (La Veiga los Pereos) 
Las Nisales 
Quintoños 
Rondero (Rondeiro)
Santa Eufemia  
Santueña
Sobrerriba (Suburriba) 
Verdugos (Vistalegre)

References

External links

Parishes in Salas